Allentown Portland Cement Company was  a   manufacturer of Portland and mortar cement.

The firm was founded in 1906 and completed its first plant in Evansville, Pennsylvania, in 1910. In 1953 it acquired Valley Forge Cement Company, and in 1960 it was itself acquired by National Gypsum Company.

References 

Cement companies of the United States
Companies based in Berks County, Pennsylvania
Chemical companies disestablished in 1960
Chemical companies established in 1906
Defunct companies based in Pennsylvania
Manufacturing companies based in Pennsylvania
1906 establishments in Pennsylvania
1960 disestablishments in Pennsylvania
1960 mergers and acquisitions